In November 2021, the country of Nicaragua waived visa requirements for Cuban nationals to travel to Nicaragua. This, alongside a growing economic crisis and increasing political instability, sparked an immigration wave of Cubans attempting to reach the United States.

Cubans travelled from Cuba to Nicaragua under the visa-free policy, then travelled further towards the Southern border of the United States, where they would be allowed into the country due to Cuban nationals being exempt from the Title 42 immigration restriction (which allowed for the U.S. government to quickly expel immigrants at the Southern border to mitigate the spread of COVID-19).

This mass immigration wave continued until President Biden repealed the Cuban exception for Title 42 in January 2023, after which Cuban encounters at the Southern border sharply declined (from a record 42,653 in December 2022 to 6,433 in January 2023 to 753 in February 2023). However, since this policy was enacted, a new rise was seen in sea encounters by Cubans, as Cubans took towards that route of entering the United States, this time directly entering South Florida through boat. Biden also expanded the Humanitarian Parole program to increase its limit to 30,000 Cubans, Venezuelans, Nicaraguans, and Haitians to enter the United States each month. However, this has been criticized as insufficient and unsustainable.

However, overall, between November 2021 and January 2023, the number of Cubans intercepted at the Southern border was a staggering 328 thousand, depopulating the island of Cuba (a country already experiencing demographic stagnation and natural decline). Since most Cubans immigrating to the United States, after crossing the border, chose to move to a region with a large Cuban American population (with many in particular choosing to move to South Florida, and enclaves such as Hialeah), this created a large jump in the Cuban American population of the region. The Miami-Dade County School District reported 27,000 students from Cuba, Haiti, Nicaragua, and Venezuela (most of them from Cuba) from the 2021–22 school year to January 10, 2023. A large Cuban student enrollment increase was especially noted in the Hialeah area.

DATA https://www.cbp.gov/newsroom/stats/nationwide-encounters
https://www.wola.org/2023/03/weekly-u-s-mexico-border-update-reduced-february-migration-2024-budget-ciudad-juarez-incident/
https://www.miamiherald.com/news/local/immigration/article270894397.html

MIAMI-DADE SCHOOLS
https://www.miamiherald.com/news/local/education/article271103247.html
https://www.cbsnews.com/miami/news/miami-dade-county-sees-uptick-in-school-enrollment/

NEW POLICY
https://www.dhs.gov/news/2023/02/21/dhs-and-doj-propose-rule-incentivize-lawful-migration-processes

CRITICISM OF POLICY
https://www.axios.com/2023/02/02/bidens-cuban-migrant-policy-unsustainable-border

See also
Cuban Americans
Cuban immigration to the United States
Golden exile
Operation Peter Pan
Freedom Flights
Mariel boatlift
1994 Cuban rafter crisis
Cuban migration to Miami
Cuban exiles

Notes

References

Cuban Americans
Cuban diaspora
2022 in Cuba
2022 in the United States
2022 in Florida
Cuba–United States relations
Cuban emigrants
Cuban-American culture in Florida
Cuban-American history
Cuban refugees
History of immigration to the United States